Kate O'Connor may refer to:
Kate O'Connor (athlete) (born 2000), Irish multi-sport athlete
Kate Lee O'Connor, American singer, songwriter and fiddler
Kathleen O'Connor (painter) (1876–1968) 
Kate O'Connor (Home and Away), fictional character from Australian soap opera Home and Away

See also
 Kate Connor (disambiguation)